Schistosoma ovuncatum is a schistosome parasite, first described in 2002. Its recognition as a new species only occurred when zoologists were re examining specimens originally described in 1984

The species was described from material collected in Chiang Mai Province, northwest Thailand. The name is derived from the shape of the egg (ovum = egg + uncatus hooked). The natural final host is the rat (Rattus rattus) and the intermediate host is the pomatiopsid snail Tricula bollingi.

References

Animals described in 2002
Waterborne diseases
Parasites of rodents
Diplostomida